This is a list of 225 species in Polydrusus, a genus of broad-nosed weevils in the family Curculionidae.

Polydrusus species

 Polydrusus abbreviatus Desbrochers, 1871 g
 Polydrusus abeillei Desbrochers des Loges, 1869 c g
 Polydrusus acuminatus Champion, 1911 c g
 Polydrusus aeratus (Gravenhorst, 1807) c g
 Polydrusus alaiensis (Faust, 1891) c g
 Polydrusus alchemillae (Hustache, 1929) c g
 Polydrusus alveolus Desbrochers, 1869
 Polydrusus americanus (Gyllenhal, 1834) i c g b
 Polydrusus amoenus (Germar, 1824) c g
 Polydrusus amplicollis Desbrochers des Loges, 1902 c g
 Polydrusus amplipennis Champion, 1911 c g
 Polydrusus analis Schilsky, 1910 c g
 Polydrusus anchoralifer (Chevrolat, 1859) c g
 Polydrusus andalusicus Solari, 1954
 Polydrusus angustus (Lucas, 1854) c g
 Polydrusus apfelbecki Solari, 1926
 Polydrusus archaetypus (Zherikhin, 1971) c g
 Polydrusus armipes Brullé, 1832 c g
 Polydrusus asniensis (Hustache, 1933) c g
 Polydrusus astutus Gyllenhal, 1834 c g
 Polydrusus atlasicus (Kocher, 1961) c g
 Polydrusus augustalisi (Pic, 1910) c g
 Polydrusus aurocupreus Gandhi & Pajni, 1984 c g
 Polydrusus auronitens (D'Amore-Fracassi, 1906) c g
 Polydrusus balearicus (Voss, 1936)
 Polydrusus bardus Gyllenhal, 1834 c g
 Polydrusus bartolii Pesarini, 1975 c g
 Polydrusus baudii (Faust, 1889) c g
 Polydrusus bedeli (Stierlin, 1884) c g
 Polydrusus biovatus (Desbrochers des Loges, 1897) c g
 Polydrusus bisphaericus (Desbrochers des Loges, 1897) c g
 Polydrusus bodemeyeri (Reitter, 1903) c g
 Polydrusus bohemani Kiesenwetter, 1852 c g
 Polydrusus brevicollis Desbrochers des Loges, 1872 c g
 Polydrusus brevipes (Kiesenwetter, 1864) c g
 Polydrusus bulgaricus (Leonhard, 1912) c g
 Polydrusus calabricus (Faust, 1890) c g
 Polydrusus carpathicus Brancsik, 1874 c g
 Polydrusus castilianus K. Daniel & J. Daniel, 1898 c g
 Polydrusus caucasicus (Desbrochers des Loges, 1872) c g
 Polydrusus cephalonicus Apfelbeck, 1922 c g
 Polydrusus cephalotes (Desbrochers des Loges, 1872) c g
 Polydrusus cervinus (Linnaeus, 1758)
 Polydrusus chilensis Kuschel, 1950 c g
 Polydrusus chinensis (Kono & Morimoto, 1960) c g
 Polydrusus chlorogaster Champion, 1911 c g
 Polydrusus chrysocephalodes Hustache, 1946 c g
 Polydrusus chrysocephalus (Chevrolat, 1859) c g
 Polydrusus chrysomela (Olivier, 1807) c g
 Polydrusus clermonti (Pic, 1919) c g
 Polydrusus cocciferae Kiesenwetter, 1864 c g
 Polydrusus confluens Stephens, 1831
 Polydrusus constellatus (Voss, 1959) c g
 Polydrusus corruscus Germar, 1824 c g
 Polydrusus cressius Pic, 1904 c g
 Polydrusus crinipes Germann, 2018 c
 Polydrusus cylindrithorax Desbrochers, 1900
 Polydrusus davatchii (Hoffmann, 1956) c g
 Polydrusus decoratus Woodruff, 1923 i c g
 Polydrusus delicatulus Horn, 1894 c g
 Polydrusus demoflysi Normand, 1951 c g
 Polydrusus deplanatus (Schilsky, 1910) c g
 Polydrusus derosasi Zumpt, 1933 c g
 Polydrusus desbrochersi (Stierlin, 1884) c g
 Polydrusus dilutus Motschulsky, 1849 c g
 Polydrusus djarkentensis (Voss, 1940) c g
 Polydrusus dohrni (Faust, 1882) c g
 Polydrusus elegans Reitter, 1887
 Polydrusus elegantulus (Boheman, 1840) c g
 Polydrusus emmae J. Müller, 1925 c g
 Polydrusus eusomoides (Desbrochers des Loges, 1899) c g
 Polydrusus faillai Desbrochers, 1889 g
 Polydrusus falsosus (Hoffmann, 1963) c g
 Polydrusus femoratus (Stierlin, 1888) g
 Polydrusus ferrugineus (Boheman, 1840) c g
 Polydrusus festae (F. Solari, 1925) c g
 Polydrusus flavipes (De Geer, 1775)
 Polydrusus flavonotatus Champion, 1911 c g
 Polydrusus formosus (Mayer, 1779) c g b  (green immigrant leaf weevil)
 Polydrusus frater (Rottenberg, 1871) c g
 Polydrusus freyi (Zumpt, 1933) c g
 Polydrusus fulvicornis (Fabricius, 1792) c g
 Polydrusus fusciclava (Desbrochers des Loges, 1908) c g
 Polydrusus fuscofasciatus Champion, 1911 c g
 Polydrusus fuscoroseus Desbrochers, 1871
 Polydrusus fuscus (Marshall, 1953) c g
 Polydrusus gemmifer (Guillebeau, 1897) c g
 Polydrusus glabratus (Gyllenhal, 1834) c g
 Polydrusus gracilicornis Kiesenwetter, 1864 g
 Polydrusus grandiceps (Desbrochers des Loges, 1875) c g
 Polydrusus griseomaculatus Desbrochers des Loges, 1869 c g
 Polydrusus guadelupensis Hustache, 1929 c g
 Polydrusus hassayampus Sleeper, 1957 i c g b
 Polydrusus henoni (Allard, 1869) c g
 Polydrusus hirsutipennis (Pic, 1908) c g
 Polydrusus hoppei (Apfelbeck, 1922) c g
 Polydrusus ibericus Stierlin, 1884 c g
 Polydrusus iliensis (Bajtenov, 1974) c g
 Polydrusus immaculatus Champion, 1911 c g
 Polydrusus impar Gozis, 1882 c g
 Polydrusus impressifrons (Gyllenhal, 1834) i c g b  (pale green weevil)
 Polydrusus inopinatus (Binaghi, 1968) c g
 Polydrusus interstitialis Perris, 1864 c g
 Polydrusus inustus Germar, 1824 c g
 Polydrusus ischnotracheloides (Hustache, 1939) c g
 Polydrusus isshikii (Kono, 1930) c g
 Polydrusus japonicus (Hustache, 1920) c g
 Polydrusus jucundus Miller, 1862 c g
 Polydrusus julianus (Reitter, 1916) c g
 Polydrusus juniperi Desbrochers des Loges, 1873 c g
 Polydrusus kadleci Borovec & Germann, 2013 c g
 Polydrusus kahri Kirsch, 1865 c g
 Polydrusus kiesenwetteri (Faust, 1887) c g
 Polydrusus korbi (Stierlin, 1888) c g
 Polydrusus lateralis Gyllenhal, 1834 c g
 Polydrusus latitarsis Hustache, 1929 c g
 Polydrusus lepineyi Hustache, 1946 c g
 Polydrusus leucaspis Boheman, 1840 c g
 Polydrusus longiceps (Schilsky, 1912) c g
 Polydrusus longicornis Champion, 1911 c g
 Polydrusus longus (Stierlin, 1884) c g
 Polydrusus lopatini Meleshko & Korotyaev, 2005 c g
 Polydrusus lucianae Francia, 1985 c g
 Polydrusus luctuosus (Desbrochers des Loges, 1875) c g
 Polydrusus lusitanicus (Chevrolat, 1879) c g
 Polydrusus macrocephalus Champion, 1911 c g
 Polydrusus manteroi (Solari & Solari, 1903) c g
 Polydrusus marcidus Kiesenwetter, 1864 c g
 Polydrusus marginatus (Stephens, 1831) c g
 Polydrusus mariae (Faust, 1882) c g
 Polydrusus maurus (Peyerimhoff, 1925) c g
 Polydrusus mecedanus Reitter, 1908 c g
 Polydrusus minutus (Stierlin, 1884) c g
 Polydrusus modestus (Stierlin, 1864) c g
 Polydrusus mogadoricus (Escalera, 1914) c g
 Polydrusus mollicomus (Peyerimhoff, 1920) c g
 Polydrusus mollis (Stroem, 1768) c g
 Polydrusus moricei Pic, 1903 c g
 Polydrusus mutabilis Champion, 1911 c g
 Polydrusus nadaii Meleshko & Korotyaev, 2005 c g
 Polydrusus neapolitanus Desbrochers des Loges, 1872 c g
 Polydrusus nothofagi Kuschel, 1950 c g
 Polydrusus obesulus Faust, 1882 c g
 Polydrusus obliquatus (Faust, 1884) c g
 Polydrusus obrieni Korotyaev, Ismailova & Meleshko, 2003 c g
 Polydrusus ochreus (Fall, 1907) i c g b
 Polydrusus pallidisetis Champion, 1911 c g
 Polydrusus pallidus (Gyllenhal, 1834) g
 Polydrusus pallipes (Lucas, 1849) c g
 Polydrusus paradoxus Stierlin, 1859 c g
 Polydrusus parallelus (Chevrolat, 1860) c g
 Polydrusus partitus Champion, 1911 c g
 Polydrusus pauper (Stierlin, 1890) c g
 Polydrusus pedemontanus (Chevrolat, 1869) c g
 Polydrusus peninsularis Horn, 1894 c g
 Polydrusus pici Schilsky, 1910 c g
 Polydrusus picus (Fabricius, 1792) c g
 Polydrusus piliferus Hochhuth, 1847 c g
 Polydrusus piligerus Stierlin, 1884 c g
 Polydrusus pilosulus Chevrolat, 1865 c g
 Polydrusus pilosus Gredler, 1866 c g
 Polydrusus pirazzolii Stierlin, 1857 c g
 Polydrusus pistaciae (Kiesenwetter, 1864) c g
 Polydrusus planifrons (Gyllenhal, 1834) c g
 Polydrusus ponticus Faust, 1888 c g
 Polydrusus prasinus Olivier, 1790
 Polydrusus privatus (Normand, 1949) c g
 Polydrusus pterygomalis (Boheman, 1840) c g
 Polydrusus pulchellus Stephens, 1831
 Polydrusus pyrenaeus Tempère, 1976
 Polydrusus quadraticollis (Desbrochers des Loges, 1902) g
 Polydrusus raverae Solari & Solari, 1903 c g
 Polydrusus reitteri Stierlin, 1884 c
 Polydrusus rhodiacus Schilsky, 1912 c g
 Polydrusus roseiceps Pesarini, 1975 c g
 Polydrusus roseus (Blanchard, 1831) c g
 Polydrusus rubicundus Pesarini, 1973 c g
 Polydrusus rufulus (Hochhuth, 1847) c g
 Polydrusus scapularis Pesarini, 1975 c g
 Polydrusus schwiegeri Reitter, 1908 c g
 Polydrusus sciaphiliformis Apfelbeck, 1898 c g
 Polydrusus scutellaris (Chevrolat, 1860) c g
 Polydrusus seidlitzi Schilsky, 1910 c g
 Polydrusus senex Chevrolat, 1866 c g
 Polydrusus sericeus (Schaller, 1783) i
 Polydrusus setifrons (Jacquelin du Val, 1852) c g
 Polydrusus sicanus Chevrolat, 1860 c g
 Polydrusus sichuanicus Korotyaev & Meleshko, 1997 c g
 Polydrusus siculus Desbrochers des Loges, 1872 g
 Polydrusus sirdariensis (Bajtenov, 1974) c g
 Polydrusus smaragdulus (Fairmaire, 1859)
 Polydrusus solarii Pesarini, 1975 c
 Polydrusus sparsus Gyllenhal, 1834 c g
 Polydrusus spiniger (Desbrochers des Loges, 1897) c g
 Polydrusus splendens F. Solari, 1909 c g
 Polydrusus stierlini Schilsky, 1910 c g
 Polydrusus subalpinus Petri, 1912 c g
 Polydrusus subcyaneus (Desbrochers des Loges, 1872) c g
 Polydrusus subglaber (Desbrochers des Loges, 1870) c g
 Polydrusus subnotatus Schilsky, 1910 c g
 Polydrusus talamellii Pesarini, 1999 c g
 Polydrusus tereticollis (De Geer, 1775) c g
 Polydrusus tibialis (Gyllenhal, 1834) c g
 Polydrusus tinauti Alonso-Zarazaga, 2013 c g
 Polydrusus tonsus (Desbrochers des Loges, 1897) c g
 Polydrusus transalpinus K. Daniel & J. Daniel, 1906 c g
 Polydrusus transjordanus Germann, 2018 c
 Polydrusus tscharynensis (Bajtenov, 1971) c g
 Polydrusus turanensis (Faust, 1891) c g
 Polydrusus turcicus Meleshko & Korotyaev, 2003 c g
 Polydrusus vagepictus (Desbrochers des Loges, 1892) c g
 Polydrusus variegatus Desbrochers, 1870 g
 Polydrusus villosithorax Apfelbeck, 1922 c g
 Polydrusus virbius (Reitter, 1899) c g
 Polydrusus virens Kiesenwetter, 1864
 Polydrusus virginalis (Faust, 1888) c g
 Polydrusus viridicinctus Gyllenhal, 1834 c g
 Polydrusus viridimarginalis Hustache, 1946 c g
 Polydrusus vodozi (Desbrochers des Loges, 1903) g
 Polydrusus vulpeculus Hustache, 1946 c g
 Polydrusus wymanni Borovec & Germann, 2013 c g
 Polydrusus xanthopus Gyllenhal, 1834 c g
 Polydrusus yunakovi Alonso- Zarazaga, 2013 c g
 Polydrusus zumpti Voss, 1958 c g
 Polydrusus zurcheri (Schilsky, 1912) g

Data sources: i = ITIS, c = Catalogue of Life, g = GBIF, b = Bugguide.net

References

Polydrusus